Diana Leung Wai-tung, MBE, JP (born 1946) is a former member of the Legislative Council of Hong Kong.

Biography
Leung studied at the Belilios Public School and attend the University of Hong Kong, obtained her bachelor's degree in geography and geology in 1968 and master's degree in urban geography in 1973. She worked as a lecturer at Department of Geography and Geology at Hong Kong University.

She was appointed to the Legislative Council by Governor David Wilson in 1988. She and Edward Leong and Jimmy McGregor, two other legislators, launched the Hong Kong Democratic Foundation in 1989 and Leung served as the founding vice-chairperson, which was seen as pro-democratic liberal political group at the time. She was one of the only three appointed members who affiliated with political organisation (the other two being Maria Tam and Lau Wong-fat). She soon quit the foundation citing her difference with the mainstream members.

She was considered as radical among the majority of the appointed and pro-government legislative councillors, as she and Szeto Wah urged for repealing the government's regulation of political activities in schools, instead of moderating as the government revised on the Education (Amendment) Bill. She was also the only appointed member to vote against the Trade Description Amendment Bill of 1991, a bill that sparked criticism from labour groups.

She was also the member of the Hong Kong Housing Authority from 1985 until her resignation on 5 November 1996.

She was one of the six female candidates in the 1991 Legislative Council election, the first ever direct election in the territory but was defeated by the candidates from the United Democrats of Hong Kong, notably Martin Lee in Hong Kong Island East.

References

1946 births
Living people
Hong Kong geographers
Hong Kong educators
Hong Kong Democratic Foundation politicians
Members of the Order of the British Empire
District councillors of Kowloon City District
Academic staff of the University of Hong Kong
Alumni of the University of Hong Kong
HK LegCo Members 1988–1991
20th-century Hong Kong women politicians